Foundry (registered as The Foundry Visionmongers Limited; also known under its former brand name The Foundry) is a British visual effects software development company with headquarters in London, and offices in Manchester and in Austin, Texas.

History 

Foundry was founded in 1996, by Bruno Nicoletti, with Simon Robinson joining soon afterwards.

In 2007, software developers Bill Collis, Simon Robinson, and Ben Kent from Foundry, in association with Anil Kokaram from Trinity College Dublin won a Scientific and Technical Award from the Academy Awards (Oscars) for the design and development of The Furnace, an integrated suite of software tools that provides temporal coherence for enhancing visual effects in motion picture sequences with high robustness, modularity and flexibility.

Alex Mahon was named CEO in November 2015. She superseded Bill Collis, who remained president and board member. Craig Rodgerson joined Foundry as new CEO in October 2017.

Foundry was bought by the owners of Digital Domain,
Wyndcrest Holdings, in March 2007, and took over DD's existing
Nuke business.  Subsequently it was subject to a
management buyout with backing from Advent Venture Partners,
and then acquired by The Carlyle Group in April 2011.

In September 2012, Foundry merged with Luxology, a Mountain View-based software house
known primarily for Modo, a 3D modelling and animation package.  Earlier the same month, it ranked at number 70 in The Sunday Times Tech Track 100, with 2011/2012 sales of approximately £15 million, a 49% increase from 2010/2011.

In April 2015 reports were that Adobe Systems was preparing to buy Foundry from The Carlyle Group.

In May 2015 it was announced that private equity firm HgCapital acquired Foundry from The Carlyle Group "for an enterprise value of £200 million".

In February 2017, the company rebranded as Foundry, dropping the "The".

In April 2019, Foundry was acquired by Roper Technologies. Following the change in ownership, in July 2019 Jody Madden took over the role of CEO from Craig Rodgerson with Madden's former role as Chief Customer Officer being taken on by Alex Foulds.

Products 

Foundry had its origins in plug-in development, and its first product was the Tinder (and later Tinderbox) plugins.  This business was sold to GenArts in 2010. It continues to sell the Furnace motion-estimation based plugins, which won an Academy Scientific and Technical Award in 2006 Other plugins include Ocula, a set of tools for stereoscopic post-processing; Keylight, a keyer; RollingShutter, which reduces CMOS artefact distortion; CameraTracker; and Kronos.

Foundry continues the development of Nuke, a node-based compositor.  Version 10.0v2 was released in June 2016

Mari, a texture painting application was released in July 2010.  It was originally developed in-house at Weta Digital for use on Avatar by Jack Greasley. Katana, a tool for look-development and lighting, originally from Sony Pictures Imageworks, was released in 2011. Hiero, a shot-management, conform, and review tool, was released in March 2012.  The software was designed in-house by Foundry.

References

External links
Foundry.com

Software companies established in 1996
Visual effects companies
Software companies based in London